Switzerland has an extensive collection of narrow-gauge railways, almost all of which are metre gauge and electrified with different voltages. Most lines have at least one interchange station with the standard gauge Swiss Federal Railways or Bern–Lötschberg–Simplon railway.

List of companies and lines

The cantons listed below are the principal areas of operation, but some lines may extend into parts of neighbouring cantons and countries:

Canton of Aargau
Aargau Verkehr operates:
 Menziken–Aarau–Schöftland line, formerly operated by the Wynental and Suhrental Railway. Services are operated as Aargau S-Bahn route .
 Bremgarten–Dietikon line, formerly operated by BDWM Transport. Services are operated as Zürich S-Bahn route .
The company also operates services on the Limmattal light rail line since December 2022.

Cantons of Appenzell Innerrhoden, Appenzell Ausserrhoden and St Gallen

Appenzell Railways, including:
Altstätten–Gais railway line
Appenzell–St. Gallen–Trogen railway
Gossau–Wasserauen railway line

Canton of Basel-Landschaft

Baselland Transport, including:
Line 10 (BLT)
Waldenburg railway - reopened in December 2022 after a 19-month conversion from 750 mm track gauge to 1000 mm gauge

Canton of Basel-Stadt

Trams in Basel

Canton of Berne

Allmendhubelbahn - funicular
Bernese Oberland Railway
Biel–Täuffelen–Ins railway
Brienz Rothorn Railway - 800 mm track gauge, not electrified and most trains operated by steam
Jungfrau Railway
Langenthal-Jura Railway
Langenthal–Melchnau railway line
Lauterbrunnen–Mürren Mountain Railway
Meiringen–Innertkirchen Railway - operated by the Zentralbahn
Niesen Funicular
Schynige Platte Railway
Regionalverkehr Bern-Solothurn (RBS), including:
Zollikofen–Bern railway
Trams in Bern
Wengernalp Railway - 800 mm track gauge
Funiculars:
Gelmer Funicular
Giessbachbahn
Gurten Funicular
Harderbahn - in Interlaken
Reichenbachfall Funicular
Closed lines:
Trams in Biel/Bienne (closed 1948)
Meiringen–Reichenbach–Aareschlucht tramway (closed 1956)
Steffisburg–Thun–Interlaken tramway (closed 1958, converted to trolleybus and later to a bus service)

Canton of Geneva

Trams in Geneva
Geneva (Chantepoulet) – Ferney (France) - Gex (France) tramway - closed in 1938 and replaced by a bus service

Canton of Fribourg

Transports publics Fribourgeois, including:
Chemins de fer électriques de la Gruyère
Gruyère–Fribourg–Morat railway
Châtel-St-Denis–Palézieux railway

Canton of Glarus

Braunwaldbahn - funicular
Sernftal tramway (closed 1969)

Canton of Grisons

Rhätische Bahn (RhB) - the longest metre-gauge railway in Switzerland, linking Arosa, Disentis, Davos, St. Moritz in the high Alps, and Tirano in Italy with Chur, including:
Albula Railway
Bernina railway
Bever–Scuol-Tarasp railway
Davos Platz–Filisur railway
Chur–Arosa railway
Reichenau-Tamins–Disentis/Mustér railway
Landquart–Thusis railway
Samedan–Pontresina railway

Cantons of Grisons, Uri and Valais

Matterhorn Gotthard Bahn (MGB)
Links with the RhB at Disentis, to Andermatt (with a branch to Goeschenen), Brig and Zermatt. The line includes several sections of rack railway. The MGB was created in by the merger in 2003 of the Furka Oberalp Bahn and BVZ Zermatt-Bahn. The MGB operates the Glacier Express jointly with the RhB.
Furka Steam Railway - a preserved railway formerly part of what is now the MGB, not electrified and most trains operated by steam
Treib–Seelisberg railway - funicular in Canton of Uri
Altdorf–Flüelen tramway (closed 1951, Canton of Uri)

Canton of Jura

Chemins de fer du Jura, including:
La Chaux-de-Fonds–Glovelier line, including the former Régional Saignelégier–Glovelier
Tavannes–Noirmont railway
La Traction - preservation group

Cantons of Lucerne, Nidwalden, Obwalden and Berne

Brünig railway line - operated by the Zentralbahn
Luzern–Stans–Engelberg railway line - including the Grafenort – Engelberg Tunnel, operated by the Zentralbahn
Pilatus Railway - 800 mm track gauge, operating in the Canton of Obwalden
Bürgenstock Funicular - Canton of Nidwalden
Sonnenberg Funicular - funicular at Kriens near Lucerne

Canton of Neuchâtel

La Chaux-de-Fonds–Glovelier line
La Chaux-de-Fonds–Les Ponts-de-Martel railway
Saignelégier–La Chaux-de-Fonds Railway
Le Locle–Les Brenets line
Trams in Neuchâtel

Canton of Schwyz

Rigi–Scheidegg railway (closed 1931)

Canton of Solothurn

Aare Seeland mobil, including:
Oberaargau-Jura Railways
Solothurn–Niederbipp railway
Solothurn–Worblaufen railway
Regionalverkehr Bern-Solothurn (RBS)

Cantons of Thurgau and St Gallen

Frauenfeld–Wil railway

Canton of Ticino

Centovalli railway - between Domodossola in Italy and Locarno
Lugano–Ponte Tresa Railway
Monte Generoso railway - 800 mm track gauge
Funiculars:
Lugano Città–Stazione funicular
Locarno–Madonna del Sasso funicular
Monte Brè funicular
Monte San Salvatore funicular
Ritom funicular
Closed lines:
Bellinzona–Mesocco railway (closed 2013)
Lugano degli Angioli funicular (closed 1986)
Lugano–Cadro–Dino railway (closed 1970)
Lugano–Tesserete railway (closed 1967)
Mendrisio electric tramway (closed 1950)
Trams in Lugano (closed 1964)

Canton of Valais

Gornergrat Railway
Jungfrau Railway
Matterhorn Gotthard Bahn (MGB) - see entry above
Transports de Martigny et Régions, including:
Martigny–Châtelard Railway (MC) - 19 km long, with one rack railway section
Riffelalp tram - 800 mm track gauge
Zermatt–Sunnegga Funicular

Canton of Vaud

Chemin de fer Nyon-St-Cergue-Morez
Chemin de fer Bière-Apples-Morges 
Chemin de fer Yverdon–Ste-Croix
Chemin de fer Lausanne–Echallens–Bercher
Chemin de Fer Montreux Oberland Bernois
Transports Publics du Chablais, including:
Aigle–Leysin railway line
Aigle–Ollon–Monthey–Champéry railway
Aigle–Sépey–Diablerets railway
Chemin de fer Bex–Villars–Bretaye
Monthey–Champéry–Morgins railway
Blonay–Chamby museum railway
Transports Montreux–Vevey–Riviera
Vevey–Chardonne–Mont Pèlerin funicular railway
Vevey–Montreux–Chillon–Villeneuve tramway (closed in 1958 and replaced by a trolleybus service)
Chemins de fer électriques Veveysans
Territet–Glion funicular railway - funicular
Cossonay–Gare–Ville funicular
Les Avants–Sonloup funicular
Clarens–Chailly–Blonay Railway (closed 1955)

Canton of Zürich

Dolderbahn - rack railway in Zürich
Forch railway
Funicular Rigiblick
Glattalbahn
Limmattal light rail line
Trams in Zürich
Closed lines:
Limmattal tramway (closed 1955)
Trams in Winterthur (closed)
Uster–Oetwil tramway (closed 1949)
Wetzikon–Meilen tramway (closed 1950)

Trams

There are trams operating on nine systems in seven Swiss cities. Street-running tramways are nearly all . The Chemin de fer Bex–Villars–Bretaye (BVB) in Bex is more of a mixed interuban light rail line connected to a rack railway but it does have some street running portions, particularly in Bex where the BVB operates along the right of way of a tramway system originally built in the 1890s.

See also
Rail transport in Switzerland

References

External links

 Swiss narrow-gauge railways

Rail transport in Switzerland
Metre gauge railways in Switzerland
Narrow-gauge